Mercedes-Benz has sold a number of automobiles with the "400" model name:
 1926–1929 Type 400 (1924–1926 15/70/100 hp)
 1992–1995 W124
 1992–1995 400E
 1992 W140
 1992 400SE
 1993 400SEL

400